Pesok is a rural locality (a village) and the administrative center of Ukhotskoye Rural Settlement of Kargopolsky District, Arkhangelsk Oblast, Russia. The population was 108 as of 2010.

Geography 
Pesok is located 56 km southwest of Kargopol (the district's administrative centre) by road. Ilyino is the nearest rural locality.

References 

Rural localities in Kargopolsky District